Krasnovo is a rural locality (a village) in Denyatinskoye Rural Settlement, Melenkovsky District, Vladimir Oblast, Russia. The population was 27 as of 2010.

Geography 
Krasnovo is located on the Chyornaya River, 16 km north of Melenki (the district's administrative centre) by road. Denyatino is the nearest rural locality.

References 

Rural localities in Melenkovsky District